The filmography of Shyam Benegal is as follows:

Feature films

Documentaries

Short films

Television

References

External links

Indian filmographies